"More Today Than Yesterday" is a song written by Pat Upton and performed by Spiral Starecase, of which Upton was the lead vocalist. The song was produced by Sonny Knight and arranged by Al Capps.

Background
The principal idea of the song was made famous at the turn of the 20th century in a poem by Rosemonde Gérard, the wife of the poet and playwright Edmond Rostand (Cyrano de Bergerac).

Chart performance
It reached No. 6 in Canada, No. 7 on the Cashbox Top 100, and No. 12 on the Billboard Hot 100 in 1969. It was also released in the United Kingdom as a single, but did not chart. The song was featured on their 1969 album, More Today Than Yesterday. It ranked No. 50 on Billboard magazine's Top Hot 100 songs of 1969.

Weekly charts

Year-end charts

Other versions
Charles Earland released a version of the song on his 1969 album, Black Talk!, and another version on his 1970 album Living Black! as well as on his 1996 album The Reunion
Shirley Scott released a version of the song on her 1969 album, Shirley Scott & the Soul Saxes
Andy Williams released a version of the song featuring The Osmonds on his 1969 Get Together with Andy Williams
Barbara McNair released a version of the song as the title track of her 1969 album More Today Than Yesterday
Barbara Acklin released a version of the song on his 1970 album Someone Else's Arms
Chris Connor released a version of the song on her 1970 album Sketches
Joe Bataan released a version of the song on his 1971 album Mr. New York And The East Side Kids
Colleen Hewett released a version of the song in Australia as the B-side of her 1971 single, "Superstar"
Lena Horne released a version of the song on her 1971 album, Nature's Baby
Sonny & Cher released a version of the song on their 1971 album, All I Ever Need Is You as well as on Sonny & Cher Live, released the same year
Ronnie Dyson released a version of the song on his 1976 album The More You Do It
Patti Austin released a version of the song on her 1976 album, End of a Rainbow
James Darren released a version of the song on his 2001 album, Because of You
Nick Carter released a version of the song on his 2003 album, Before the Backstreet Boys 1989–1993
Grant Green recorded a live version of the song in 1971, which was however released only on his 2006 album Live at Club Mozambique
Diana Ross includes the song as part of her playlist in many concerts, including the More Today Than Yesterday: The Greatest Hits Tour and recorded the song for her 2006 album I Love You
The CompanY released a version of the song on their 2008 album with Gerard Salonga and FILharmoniKA titled Group Hug
Kermit Ruffins released a version of the song on his 2010 album Happy Talk
Chicago, with the Les Deux Love Orchestra, released a cover of the song on iTunes in 2013
Allan Harris recorded a version on his 2016 album, Nobody's Gonna Love You Better
Nyoy Volante recorded the song for the 2018 Philippine drama series Playhouse

In media
 Goldfinger released a version of the song that was featured in the ending credits of the 1998 film The Waterboy.
 Jordan McCoy sang a version of the song on American Juniors.
 Kenneth "Ken" Dingle sang a version of the song when he was a semi-finalist on Philippine Idol.
 Tito Sotto, Vic Sotto, and Joey de Leon performed a version of the song on the 37th Anniversary of Eat Bulaga!
 Briefly heard in the first entrance of Jamie Lee Curtis's character in My Girl.
 Sung by character Richard Fish (Greg Germann) at the Christmas party in Ally McBeal - S1E11 (Silver Bells)
 The Spiral Starecase's version appears in a 2021 TV commercial for Delta faucets.
 In The Mule (2018 film), this song was the lifelong love song (the "our song") of Earl and Mary, which was made clear on Mary's deathbed when their last words together were quotations of the chorus's first two lines.

See also
 List of one-hit wonders in the United States

References

External links
 
 

1969 songs
1969 singles
Spiral Starecase songs
Diana Ross songs
Columbia Records singles